Inly School is a private, independent pre K–8 Montessori school in Scituate, Massachusetts,  south of Boston for students in toddler and preschool through 8th grade. It serves students from 20 towns on the South Shore of Boston and beyond, including Cohasset, Hingham, Norwell, Hull, Marshfield, Hanover, Pembroke, and Plymouth. Inly blends Montessori curriculum and philosophy with educational best practices to teach core subjects, world languages, arts, athletics, and life skills in a highly experiential and individualized manner. 

Inly's campus includes the Meehan Family Artsbarn, which is used for performing arts, sports, assemblies, and a new 14,000 sq ft Innovation Center which opened in September 2016. The center houses an Innovation Lab called the da Vinci Studio, a Digital Lab and Design Studio, a Think Tank, a Maker Space, a new Library, and six new classrooms. In April 2012, the school purchased a  parcel of land adjacent to the main campus to create an outdoor space for hands-on science and nature classes and experiential learning of all kinds. Called the Outdoor Classroom, this extension of the campus features a rock wall, outdoor amphitheater, several school gardens, ropes courses, and nature trails. 

Inly is fully accredited by the Association of Independent Schools in New England (AISNE) and the American Montessori Society (AMS). 
The Inly curriculum aligns with the Massachusetts State Frameworks and follows a three-year cultural studies rotation that covers ancient civilizations, American civilization, and world civilizations, all viewed through the lens of the fundamental needs of humans. 

The Inly campus includes two playing fields and three playgrounds for different age groups. Inly Middle School sports teams participate in two interscholastic athletic leagues: the New England Preparatory School Athletic Council (NEPSAC) and the Montessori Athletic Conference (MAC) of Massachusetts.

Inly School was founded in 1973, as The Montessori Community School. In 2004 the school was renamed Inly School. The adverb “inly” means to do something with great depth of knowledge and understanding.

External links
http://www.inlyschool.org
Boston Globe “Art’s Power to Teach 21st Century Skills” 12/08/08
 Scituate's Inly School to compete in Icebreaker rowing tournament Boston Globe 11-08-11
 Video: Arabic music at Inly School in Scituate Scituate Mariner / Wicked Local Scituate 10-20-11
 Environmental Science: NSRWA, Inly School partner for pilot program Norwell Mariner / Wicked Local Norwell 11-18-11
 Scituate's Inly School campus expands to 10 acres from six Boston.com 4-26-12
 Inly School Builds for the Future New building with maker space for robotics, 3D printing and STEM – plus a digital lab and design studio for architecture, digital photography, video and graphic design. Scituate Mariner 2-13-16

Private elementary schools in Massachusetts
Private middle schools in Massachusetts